Ahmad Awaluddin "Awal" bin Ashaari (born 6 August 1981) is a Malaysian actor, model and TV host.

Early life and career
Awal Ashaari was born in Kampung Baru, Kuala Lumpur, Malaysia. He holds a diploma from Universiti Teknologi MARA in mass communications. 

He then went on to work at Leo Burnett advertising, where its executive creative director Yasmin Ahmad is also a filmmaker, as an account executive, but felt he did not belong there. He then went on to become a newsreader for 8TV's Twenty Hundred News for eight months in 2003. It was also at that time was the first season of Malaysian Idol competition and Awal managed to reach the final 30 cut-off. Later in 2004, FCUK had a model search competition and he was selected.

Besides modelling and fashion spreads, Awal hosts Beat TV on Astro Ria. He has also been involved in numerous Malay dramas such as Impak Maksima, Noktah Erna and Cinta Medik.
Previously, he was the host of One in a Million, a Malaysian reality singing competition show. He was also the host for a reality TV show on Astro Ria, Mari Menari season 1 with Lisa Surihani.

Personal life

Awal married actress Scha Alyahya on 4 May 2012. Lara Alana is his first child with Scha. His second child, another daughter, was born on 12 February 2021 and bestowed the name Lyla Amina.

Filmography

Film

Television series

Television

References

External links
 

1981 births
Malaysian male actors
People from Kuala Lumpur
Malaysian people of Malay descent
Malaysian television personalities
Living people
Malaysian infotainers
One in a Million (Malaysian TV series)